Kenneth Roy Carrington (born 3 September 1950) is a former New Zealand rugby union player. A wing and centre three-quarter, Carrington represented Auckland and, briefly, Bay of Plenty at a provincial level, and was a member of the New Zealand national side, the All Blacks, from 1971 to 1972. He played nine matches for the All Blacks including three internationals.

References

1950 births
Living people
Rugby union players from Whakatāne
People educated at Opotiki College
People educated at Rutherford College, Auckland
New Zealand rugby union players
New Zealand international rugby union players
Māori All Blacks players
Auckland rugby union players
Bay of Plenty rugby union players
Rugby union wings
Rugby union centres